Morocco- sovereign country located in western North Africa.  Morocco has a coast on the Atlantic Ocean that reaches past the Strait of Gibraltar into the Mediterranean Sea. It has international borders with Algeria to the east, Spain to the north (a water border through the Strait and land borders with two small Spanish autonomous cities, Ceuta and Melilla), and a disputed border with Western Sahara to the south.

Morocco is an African country currently a member of the African Union. it is also a member of the  Arab League at present, Arab Maghreb Union, the Francophonie, Organisation of Islamic Cooperation, Mediterranean Dialogue group, and Group of 77, and is a major non-NATO ally of the United States.

The following outline is provided as an overview of and topical guide to Morocco:

General reference 

 Pronunciation: 
 Common English country name:  Morocco
 Official English country name:  The Kingdom of Morocco
 Common endonym(s): المغرب 
 Official endonym(s): المملكة المغربية 
 Adjectival(s): Moroccan
 Demonym(s): Moroccan
 Etymology: Name of Morocco
 International rankings of Morocco
 ISO country codes:  MA, MAR, 504
 ISO region codes:  See ISO 3166-2:MA
 Internet country code top-level domain:  .ma

Geography of Morocco 

Geography of Morocco
 Morocco is: a country
 Location
 Morocco is situated within the following regions:
 Western Hemisphere and Northern Hemisphere
 Africa
 Sahara Desert
 North Africa
 Maghreb
 Time zone:  Western European Time (UTC+00), Western European Summer Time (UTC+01)
 Extreme points of Morocco
 High:  Jbel Toubkal 
 Low:  Sebkha paki Tah 
 Land boundaries:  2,018 km
 1,559 km
Western Sahara 443 km (although there's no de facto boundary)
 16 km
 Coastline:  1,835 km
 Population of Morocco: 37,765,613 as of 2021  - 39th most populous country

 Area of Morocco: 712,550 km2
 Atlas of Morocco

Environment of Morocco 

 Climate of Morocco
 Ecoregions in Morocco
 Renewable energy in Morocco
 Protected areas of Morocco
 National parks of Morocco
 Wildlife of Morocco
 Flora of Morocco
 Fauna of Morocco
 Birds of Morocco
 Mammals of Morocco

Natural geographic features of Morocco 
 Glaciers in Morocco: none 
 Rivers of Morocco
 World Heritage Sites in Morocco
Atlas Mountains
Rif Mountains
Saharan desert

Regions of Morocco 

Regions of Morocco

Ecoregions of Morocco 

List of ecoregions in Morocco
 Ecoregions in Morocco

Administrative divisions of Morocco 

Administrative divisions of Morocco
 Regions of Morocco
 Prefectures and provinces of Morocco

Regions of Morocco 

Regions of Morocco

Prefectures and provinces of Morocco 

Prefectures and provinces of Morocco

Municipalities of Morocco 
 Capital of Morocco: Rabat
 Cities of Morocco
Agadir
Beni Mellal
Casablanca
El Jadida
Fez
Kenitra
Ksar el-Kebir
Marrakesh
Meknes
Merzouga
Oujda
Salé
Sefrou
Tangier
Temara
Zagora

Demography of Morocco 

Demographics of Morocco

Government and politics of Morocco 
Politics of Morocco
 Form of government: parliamentary constitutional monarchy
 Capital of Morocco: Rabat
 Elections in Morocco
 (specific elections)
 Political parties in Morocco

Branches of the government of Morocco 

Government of Morocco

Executive branch of the government of Morocco 
 Head of state: King of Morocco,
 Head of government: Prime Minister of Morocco,
 Cabinet of Morocco

Legislative branch of the government of Morocco 
 Parliament of Morocco (bicameral)
 Upper house: Senate of Morocco
 Lower house: House of Commons of Morocco

Judicial branch of the government of Morocco 

Court system of Morocco

Foreign relations of Morocco 

Foreign relations of Morocco
 Diplomatic missions in Morocco
 Diplomatic missions of Morocco

International organization membership 
The Kingdom of Morocco is a member of:

African Development Bank Group (AfDB)
Arab Bank for Economic Development in Africa (ABEDA)
Arab Fund for Economic and Social Development (AFESD)
Arab Maghreb Union (AMU)
Arab Monetary Fund (AMF)
European Bank for Reconstruction and Development (EBRD)
Food and Agriculture Organization (FAO)
Group of 77 (G77)
International Atomic Energy Agency (IAEA)
International Bank for Reconstruction and Development (IBRD)
International Chamber of Commerce (ICC)
International Civil Aviation Organization (ICAO)
International Criminal Court (ICCt) (signatory)
International Criminal Police Organization (Interpol)
International Development Association (IDA)
International Federation of Red Cross and Red Crescent Societies (IFRCS)
International Finance Corporation (IFC)
International Fund for Agricultural Development (IFAD)
International Hydrographic Organization (IHO)
International Labour Organization (ILO)
International Maritime Organization (IMO)
International Mobile Satellite Organization (IMSO)
International Monetary Fund (IMF)
International Olympic Committee (IOC)
International Organization for Migration (IOM)
International Organization for Standardization (ISO)
International Red Cross and Red Crescent Movement (ICRM)
International Telecommunication Union (ITU)
International Telecommunications Satellite Organization (ITSO)

International Trade Union Confederation (ITUC)
Inter-Parliamentary Union (IPU)
Islamic Development Bank (IDB)
League of Arab States (LAS)
Multilateral Investment Guarantee Agency (MIGA)
Nonaligned Movement (NAM)
Organisation internationale de la Francophonie (OIF)
Organisation of Islamic Cooperation (OIC)
Organization for Security and Cooperation in Europe (OSCE) (partner)
Organisation for the Prohibition of Chemical Weapons (OPCW)
Organization of American States (OAS) (observer)
Permanent Court of Arbitration (PCA)
United Nations (UN)
United Nations Conference on Trade and Development (UNCTAD)
United Nations Educational, Scientific, and Cultural Organization (UNESCO)
United Nations High Commissioner for Refugees (UNHCR)
United Nations Industrial Development Organization (UNIDO)
United Nations Operation in Cote d'Ivoire (UNOCI)
United Nations Organization Mission in the Democratic Republic of the Congo (MONUC)
Universal Postal Union (UPU)
World Confederation of Labour (WCL)
World Customs Organization (WCO)
World Federation of Trade Unions (WFTU)
World Health Organization (WHO)
World Intellectual Property Organization (WIPO)
World Meteorological Organization (WMO)
World Tourism Organization (UNWTO)
World Trade Organization (WTO)

Law and order in Morocco 

Law of Morocco
 Cannabis in Morocco
 Constitution of Morocco
 Human rights in Morocco
 LGBT rights in Morocco
 Child marriage in Morocco
 Law enforcement in Morocco

Military of Morocco 

Military of Morocco
 Command
 Commander-in-chief:
 Forces
 Army of Morocco
 Navy of Morocco
 Air Force of Morocco
 Military history of Morocco

Local government in Morocco 

Local government in Morocco

History of Morocco 

History of Morocco
Current events of Morocco
 Economic history of Morocco
 Military history of Morocco

Culture of Morocco 

Culture of Morocco
 Architecture of Morocco
 Cuisine of Morocco
 Languages of Morocco
 Media in Morocco
 Museums in Morocco
 National symbols of Morocco
 Coat of arms of Morocco
 Flag of Morocco
 National anthem of Morocco
 Moroccan people
 Prostitution in Morocco
 Public holidays in Morocco
 Religion in Morocco
 Christianity in Morocco
 Islam in Morocco
 Judaism in Morocco
 World Heritage Sites in Morocco

Art in Morocco 
 Cinema of Morocco
 Literature of Morocco
 Music of Morocco
 Television in Morocco

Famous Artists of Morocco:

 Hassan El Glaoui
 Youness Errami
 Ayoub Aboubaigi

Sports in Morocco 

Sports in Morocco
 Football in Morocco
 Morocco at the Olympics
Royal Moroccan Equestrian Federation
Tbourida or fantasia
Miss Moto Maroc

Famous Athletes of Morocco

 Fatima El-Faquir
 Nawal El Moutawakel
 Said Äouita

Royal Family of Morocco 
Alaouite Dynasty

 Mohammed VI
 Lalla Salma
 Lalla Khadeja
 Moulay Hassan 
 Moulay Rachid
 Lalla Amina
 Hassan II
 Mohammed V
 Moulay Abedellah Alaoui

Economy and infrastructure of Morocco 

Economy of Morocco
 Economic rank, by nominal GDP (2007): 57th (fifty-seventh)
 Agriculture in Morocco
 Communications in Morocco
 Internet in Morocco
 Companies of Morocco
Currency of Morocco: Dirham
ISO 4217: MAD
 Economic history of Morocco
 Energy in Morocco
 Energy policy of Morocco
 Health care in Morocco
 Mining in Morocco
 Morocco Stock Exchange
 Tourism in Morocco
 Transport in Morocco
 Airports in Morocco
 Rail transport in Morocco
 Water supply and sanitation in Morocco

Education in Morocco 

Education in Morocco

Health in Morocco 

Health in Morocco

See also 

Morocco
Index of Morocco-related articles
List of international rankings
List of Morocco-related topics
Member state of the United Nations
Outline of Africa
Outline of geography
Outline of Western Sahara

References

External links 

 Government
 Kingdom of Morocco (official portal)
  Parliament of Morocco (official site)
  Public services website
 Maghreb Arabe Presse (government news agency)

 Overviews
 Worldstatesmen.org/Morocco.htm
 Encyclopædia Britannica, Morocco - Country Page
 CIA World FactbookMorocco

 Media
 Morocco Board News
 Moroccan American Community Television

 Directories
 
 Morocco Directory
 Morocco Web Directory

 Communities
 The Moroccan American Community & around the world
 The Moroccan American Community Board
 Maroc Entrepreneurs Association dedicated to the Promotion of Entrepreneurship in Morocco
  Moroccans around the world
 Portal of Moroccans in the U.S.
 A Moroccan Community Online
 Online Community for Moroccan Arabic Learners

 Trade and external relations
 Historical Background on United States - Morocco Relations
 Koutoubia Mosque, Marrakesh
 Moroccan American Trade Council
  
 Moroccousafta a site about the Morocco/US Free Trade Agreement

 Surveys and Studies
 Human Rights Watch on Morocco
   revealed by STR analysis
  (CSIS — The Center for Strategic and International Studies)

 Tourism and culture

 Biodiversity of South Western Morocco (Flora and Plant Communities of Morocco)
 Moroccan Dialectal Arabic
 lexicorient A reference site to plan its trip, and discover the country.

Morocco